Visa requirements for British Nationals (Overseas) are administrative entry restrictions by the authorities of other states and territories placed on British National (Overseas) passport holders. Several million people, the vast majority with a Hong Kong connection, hold this passport.

Holders of British National (Overseas) citizenship are British nationals and Commonwealth citizens, but not British citizens. This nationality, by itself, does not grant  the right of abode anywhere in the world, including the United Kingdom or Hong Kong, but all BN(O)s possess either right of abode or right to land in Hong Kong due to holding right of abode before 1997. BN(O)s are subject to British immigration controls and do not have the automatic right to live or work in the United Kingdom. From January 2021, they are eligible to apply for limited leave to remain to work or study in the UK with a path to citizenship, as a consequence of the Chinese national security law imposed on Hong Kong, which the UK considers a violation of the Sino-British Joint Declaration signed in 1984.

The British National (Overseas) status was created in 1985 in anticipation of the transfer of sovereignty of Hong Kong on 1 July 1997. This nationality was "tailor-made" for British Hong Kong residents with British Dependent Territories Citizen (BDTC) status by virtue of their connection with Hong Kong; it allowed the people of British Hong Kong to retain a relationship with the United Kingdom after the transfer of sovereignty of Hong Kong to China. BN(O)s enjoy consular protection as British nationals would when travelling outside Hong Kong. Since most BN(O)s also hold Chinese nationality, they do not enjoy consular protection in China, Hong Kong and Macau, owing to the master nationality rule. From 1 July 1987 to 30 June 1997, nearly 3.4 million of British Dependent Territories Citizens in Hong Kong successfully registered as a British National (Overseas). All BDTCs relate only to Hong Kong lost their BDTC status on 1 July 1997, and any BDTC who did not register as a BN(O) and without other nationality automatically acquired British Overseas Citizenship.

Visa requirements for other classes of British nationals such as British citizens, British Overseas Citizens, British Overseas Territories Citizens, British Protected Persons or British Subjects are different.

Starting from 31 January 2021, China and the Hong Kong SAR governments no longer recognize the British National (Overseas) passport as a valid travel document.

Visa requirements map

Visa requirements
This table documents the visa requirements, and not travel restrictions related to the COVID-19 pandemic.

British Crown Dependencies and Overseas Territories

Territories and disputed areas

Non-visa restrictions

Travel restrictions related to the COVID-19 pandemic

Due to the COVID-19 pandemic, several countries have imposed temporary travel restrictions on British nationals or persons arriving from the United Kingdom.
 — admission refused, except spouses and children of Filipino nationals.
 — visitors who have been in, transited through, or are nationals of several designated "high-risk countries" (including the United Kingdom) are not allowed to enter.
 — admission refused temporarily due to new COVID strain
 — admission refused temporarily due to new COVID strain
 — admission refused temporarily due to new COVID strain
 — admission refused temporarily due to new COVID strain
 — admission refused temporarily due to new COVID strain
 — admission refused temporarily due to new COVID strain
 — admission refused temporarily due to new COVID strain
 — admission refused temporarily due to new COVID strain
 — admission refused temporarily due to new COVID strain
 — admission refused temporarily due to new COVID strain
 — admission refused temporarily due to new COVID strain
 — admission refused temporarily due to new COVID strain
 — admission refused temporarily due to new COVID strain
 — admission refused temporarily due to new COVID strain (excluding British Citizens resident in Northern Ireland)
 — admission refused temporarily due to new COVID strain
 — admission refused temporarily due to new COVID strain
 — admission refused temporarily due to new COVID strain
 — admission refused temporarily due to new COVID strain
 — admission refused temporarily due to new COVID strain
 — admission refused temporarily due to new COVID strain
 — admission refused temporarily due to new COVID strain
 — admission refused temporarily due to new COVID strain
 — admission refused temporarily due to new COVID strain
 — admission refused temporarily due to new COVID strain
 — admission refused temporarily due to new COVID strain
 — admission refused temporarily due to new COVID strain
 — admission refused temporarily due to new COVID strain
 — admission refused temporarily due to new COVID strain
 — admission refused temporarily due to new COVID strain

Right to consular protection

British Nationals (Overseas) have the right to consular protection from British diplomatic missions except in China, Hong Kong, and Macau.

When in a country where there is no British embassy, British Nationals (Overseas) may get help from the embassy of any other commonwealth country present in that country. There are also informal arrangements with some other countries, including New Zealand and Australia, to help British nationals in some countries.

Foreign travel statistics

See also

 British passport
 British National (Overseas)
 British National (Overseas) passport
 British nationality law
 Visa requirements for British Citizens
 Visa requirements for British Overseas Citizens
 Visa requirements for British Overseas Territories Citizens
 Visa policy of the United Kingdom

References and notes
References

Notes

Foreign relations of the United Kingdom
British Nationals (Overseas)